Charles McPherson is an album by saxophonist Charles McPherson which was recorded in 1971 and released on the Mainstream label.

Track listing 
All compositions by Charles McPherson except as indicated
 "What's Going On" (Marvin Gaye, Renaldo Benson, Al Cleveland) - 3:26   
 "Serenity" - 7:25
 "My Funny Valentine (Richard Rodgers, Lorenz Hart) - 7:37 
 "Another Kind of Blues" - 7:03
 "While We're Young" (Alec Wilder, William Engvick, Morty Palitz) - 6:33  
 "Bird Feathers" (Charlie Parker) - 5:10

Personnel 
Charles McPherson - alto saxophone
Lonnie Hillyer - trumpet
Gene Bertoncini, Carl Lynch - guitar
Nico Bunink, Barry Harris - piano
Ron Carter - bass
Leroy Williams - drums

References 

Charles McPherson (musician) albums
1971 albums
Mainstream Records albums
Albums produced by Bob Shad